Limonium strictissimum is a species of plant in the family Plumbaginaceae. It is found in France and Italy. Its natural habitat is Mediterranean-type shrubby vegetation. It is threatened by habitat loss.

References

strictissimum
Matorral shrubland
Flora of Italy
Flora of France
Critically endangered plants
Critically endangered biota of Europe
Taxonomy articles created by Polbot